The Event is a 2015 Russian-language Belgian-Dutch documentary film about the 1991 Soviet coup d'état attempt produced, written and directed by Sergei Loznitsa. It was screened out of competition at the 72nd edition of the Venice Film Festival.

References

External links  

2015 films
2015 documentary films
Belgian documentary films
Dutch documentary films
Films directed by Sergei Loznitsa